Nancy A. Michael is a former Democratic member of the Indiana House of Representatives, representing the 44th District from 2009–2010. She was formerly the Mayor of Greencastle, serving for 12 years from January 1996 through December 2007.

External links
Indiana State Legislature - Representative Nancy Michael official government website
Nancy Michael, State Representative official campaign website
Profile at Project Vote Smart
Follow the Money - Nancy A Michael
2008 campaign contributions

Democratic Party members of the Indiana House of Representatives

Living people
Women state legislators in Indiana
People from Greencastle, Indiana
Year of birth missing (living people)
20th-century American politicians
20th-century American women politicians
21st-century American politicians
21st-century American women politicians
Mayors of places in Indiana
Women mayors of places in Indiana